Ralph Abraham may refer to:

 Ralph Abraham (mathematician) (born 1936), American mathematician
 Ralph Abraham (politician) (born 1954), member of the U.S. House of Representatives